Kyle Timothy "Stonewall" Bjornethun (born March 16, 1995) is an American retired soccer player who played for Phoenix Rising FC in the USL Championship.

Career

Amateur and college
Bjornethun spent four years playing college soccer at Seattle University between 2013 and 2016.

Cicerone also appeared for USL PDL sides Seattle Sounders FC U-23 and Puget Sound Gunners.

Professional
On January 17, 2017, Bjornethun was selected in the fourth round, with the final pick of the draft (88th overall), of the 2017 MLS SuperDraft by Seattle Sounders FC. However, he instead signed for United Soccer League side Portland Timbers 2. Bjornethun made his USL an Portland Timbers 2 debut on March 25, 2017, against Real Monarchs.

Career statistics

References

External links
 
 

1995 births
Living people
American soccer players
Association football defenders
FC Tucson players
People from Snohomish, Washington
Portland Timbers 2 players
Puget Sound Gunners FC players
Phoenix Rising FC players
Seattle Redhawks men's soccer players
Seattle Sounders FC draft picks
Seattle Sounders FC U-23 players
Soccer players from Washington (state)
Sportspeople from the Seattle metropolitan area
Toronto FC II players
USL Championship players
USL League One players
USL League Two players